Chevillé is a commune in the Sarthe department in the Pays de la Loire region in north-western France.

Geography
The river Vègre forms all of the commune's western border.

See also
Communes of the Sarthe department

References

Communes of Sarthe